House of Day, House of Night is a novel by Olga Tokarczuk, published by Wydawnictwo Ruta in 1998.

Synopsis 
Although nominally a novel, House of Day, House of Night is rather a patchwork of loosely connected disparate stories, sketches, and essays about life past and present in the author's adopted home of Krajanów, a Polish village in the Sudetes near the Polish-Czech border. While some have labeled the novel Tokarczuk's most "difficult" piece, at least for those unfamiliar with Central European history, it was her first book to be published in English.

Publication 
Dom dzienny, dom nocny was first published by Tokarczuk's independent publishing company Wydawnictwo Ruta in 1998.

In 1999, the book sold 40,000 copies, which placed it sixth overall among the year's bestsellers written by Polish authors.

In late 2000, Bertelsmann published the novel on the Internet. For this reason, Dom dzienny, dom nocny became the first novel in Poland to be published on the Internet in electronic form. The book was made available as a plain text file on the Świat Książki website. This event is considered to be the beginning of the e-book market in Poland.

Translation 
The novel was translated into English as House of Day, House of Night by translator Antonia Lloyd-Jones. It was first published in the United Kingdom by Granta Books in 2002. In 2003, it was published in the United States by Northwestern University Press.

Reception 
In a review from 1998,  described the novel as "Olga Tokarczuk's most ambitious prose project", and also indicated that it integrates different styles and genres. , who was previously critical Tokarczuk, regarded the novel as the first praiseworthy work in her oeuvre. Kinga Dunin praised Tokarczuk for finding her unique voice in the novel; Dunin also felt that the novel would help readers cope with death anxiety.  described it as "one of the most beautiful sylwa" in Polish literature.

The novel was awarded the Nike Award's audience prize for 1999.

Awards and honours

References 

Polish novels
1998 novels
20th-century Polish novels
Novels by Olga Tokarczuk
1998 in Poland